The greater grison (Galictis vittata) is a species of mustelid native to Southern Mexico, Central America, and South America.

Description

The greater grison is a slender animal with short legs, a long neck, and a short, bushy tail.

The back, flanks, top of the head, and the tail, are grizzled grey in color, while the rest of the body is much darker, and usually solid black. A narrow whitish stripe separates the darker and lighter fur on the head and shoulder, but not further back, where the two colors may, in some individuals, blur into one another. The head is flattened and broad, with short, rounded ears, and dark brown to black eyes. The legs are muscular, with five webbed toes, each ending in a sharp, curved claw.

Distribution and habitat
Greater grisons are native to North and South America, ranging from southern Mexico in the north, to central Brazil, Peru, and Bolivia in the south. They inhabit a wide range of forest and cerrado habitats, and are usually seen near rivers and streams. In some regions, they may also be found in cultivated areas, such as plantations and rice paddies. Four living, and one fossil subspecies are recognised:

 Galictis vittata vittata – northern South America
 Galictis vittata andina – Peru and Bolivia
 Galictis vittata brasiliensis – Brazil
 Galictis vittata canaster – Central America and southern Mexico
 † Galictis vittata fossilis – Pleistocene Brazil

Behaviour
Greater grisons are primarily terrestrial, although they can climb trees and swim well. They are mostly diurnal, and only occasionally active at night. They live alone or in pairs, with home ranges of at least , and a very low population density, such that they are rarely encountered in the wild. They spend the night sleeping in cavities in hollow logs or beneath tree roots, or else in the abandoned burrows of other animals.

Little is known of their diet, although it consists largely of small vertebrates, such as fish, amphibians, birds, and other mammals. While hunting, they move in a zigzag pattern, making short bounds and occasionally stopping to look around with their heads raised and sniff the air. When moving more cautiously, they press their bodies close to the ground in a movement that has been described as 'snake-like'. They have been reported to respond to threats with a series of grunts that rise in intensity and frequency until they become rapid barks, and finally a single loud scream with their teeth bared.

Biology
Like many other mustelids, greater grisons possess anal scent glands that secrete a yellowish or greenish musk. Although not especially noxious in comparison with that of other species, this can be sprayed at attackers, as well as being used to mark the grison's territory.

Litters of up to four young are born from March to September, after a gestation period of 39 days. Their eyes open after two weeks, and they begin to eat solid food at three weeks, reaching the adult size in just four months. They have lived for at least ten years in captivity.

References

Carnivorans of North America
Carnivorans of Central America
Carnivorans of South America
Mammals of Bolivia
Mammals of Brazil
Mammals of Colombia
Mammals of Mexico
Mammals of Peru
Mammals of Venezuela
Fauna of the Amazon
Least concern biota of North America
Least concern biota of South America
Mammals described in 1776
Taxa named by Johann Christian Daniel von Schreber